Jemin Gjana (Born May 5, 1950) is a member of the Assembly of the Republic of Albania for the Democratic Party of Albania.

References 

Living people
Democratic Party of Albania politicians
Members of the Parliament of Albania
21st-century Albanian politicians
Government ministers of Albania
Agriculture ministers of Albania
1950 births